Events in the year 1895 in Germany.

Incumbents

National level
 Kaiser – Wilhelm II
 Chancellor – Chlodwig, Prince of Hohenlohe-Schillingsfürst
 Chancellor – Chlodwig, Prince of Hohenlohe-Schillingsfürst
 Chancellor – Chlodwig, Prince of Hohenlohe-Schillingsfürst
 Chancellor – Chlodwig, Prince of Hohenlohe-Schillingsfürst
 Chancellor – Chlodwig, Prince of Hohenlohe-Schillingsfürst
 Chancellor – Chlodwig, Prince of Hohenlohe-Schillingsfürst
 Chancellor – Chlodwig, Prince of Hohenlohe-Schillingsfürst
 Chancellor – Chlodwig, Prince of Hohenlohe-Schillingsfürst

State level

Kingdoms
 King of Bavaria – Otto of Bavaria
 King of Prussia – Kaiser Wilhelm II
 King of Saxony – Albert of Saxony
 King of Württemberg – William II of Württemberg

Grand Duchies
 Grand Duke of Baden – Frederick I
 Grand Duke of Hesse – Ernest Louis
 Grand Duke of Mecklenburg-Schwerin – Frederick Francis III
 Grand Duke of Mecklenburg-Strelitz – Frederick William
 Grand Duke of Oldenburg – Peter II
 Grand Duke of Saxe-Weimar-Eisenach – Charles Alexander

Principalities
 Schaumburg-Lippe – George, Prince of Schaumburg-Lippe
 Schwarzburg-Rudolstadt – Günther Victor, Prince of Schwarzburg-Rudolstadt
 Schwarzburg-Sondershausen – Karl Günther, Prince of Schwarzburg-Sondershausen
 Principality of Lippe – Woldemar, Prince of Lippe to 20 March, then Alexander, Prince of Lippe (with Prince Adolf of Schaumburg-Lippe as regent)
 Reuss Elder Line – Heinrich XXII, Prince Reuss of Greiz
 Reuss Younger Line – Heinrich XIV, Prince Reuss Younger Line
 Waldeck and Pyrmont – Friedrich, Prince of Waldeck and Pyrmont

Duchies
 Duke of Anhalt – Frederick I, Duke of Anhalt
 Duke of Brunswick – Prince Albert of Prussia (regent)
 Duke of Saxe-Altenburg – Ernst I, Duke of Saxe-Altenburg
 Duke of Saxe-Coburg and Gotha – Alfred, Duke of Saxe-Coburg and Gotha
 Duke of Saxe-Meiningen – Georg II, Duke of Saxe-Meiningen

Colonial Governors
 Cameroon (Kamerun) – Jesko von Puttkamer (3rd term) to 27 March, then ...von Lücke to 4 May, then again Jesko von Puttkamer (4th term) to 26 October, then from 27 October Theodor Seitz (2nd term)
 German East Africa (Deutsch-Ostafrika) – Friedrich Radbod Freiher von Schele to 25 April, then Hermann Wissmann
 German New Guinea (Deutsch-Neuguinea) – Gerog Schmiele to 3 March, then Hugo Rüdiger (both Landeshauptleute of the German New Guinea Company)
 German South-West Africa (Deutsch-Südwestafrika) – Theodor Leutwein (Landeshauptleute)
 Togoland – Jesko von Puttkamer (Landeshauptleute) (2nd term) to 13 August, then vacant to 18 November, then August Köhler (Landeshauptleute)

Events

 5 May – German football club Fortuna Düsseldorf is founded.
 8 November – Wilhelm Röntgen produces and detects electromagnetic radiation in a wavelength range known as X-rays or Röntgen rays 
 15 December – German football club Eintracht Braunschweig is founded.

Undated
 Hermann Emil Fischer and Arthur Speier first describe Fischer–Speier esterification.
 Wilhelm Emil Fein invents the electrically-driven hand drill.
 Carl von Linde files for patent of the Linde cycle.

Births
20 January – Walter Bock, German chemist (died 1948)
14 February – Max Horkheimer German philosopher and sociologist (died 1973)
15 February – Wilhelm Burgdorf, German general (died 1945)
7 March – Werner Schrader, German officer (died 1944)
29 March – Ernst Jünger, German author (died 1998)
7 April:
Margarete Schön, German actress (died 1985)
Theodor Strünck, German lawyer (died 1945)
15 June – Paul Giesler, German politician (died 1945)
6 July – Ernst Langlotz, German archaeologist (died 1978)
10 July – Carl Orff, German composer (died 1982) 
9 August – Franz Schafheitlin, German actor (died 1980)
13 August – Werner Dankwort, German diplomat (died 1986)
26 August – Harald Paulsen, German actor (died 1954)
31 August – Karl Fiehler, German politician (died 1969)
4 September – Erich Weise, German historian and archivist (1972)
6 September – Walter Dornberger, German Army artillery officer, leader of the V-2 rocket programme (died 1980)
15 September – Hildebrand Gurlitt, German art dealer, art historian and war profiteer (died 1956)
25 September – Friedrich Gustav Jaeger, German resistance fighter (died 1944)
5 October – Ludwig Gehre, German officer (died 1945)
10 October – Wolfram Freiherr von Richthofen, German field marshal (died 1945)
13 October – Kurt Schumacher, German politician (died 1952)
26 October – Joseph-Ernst Graf Fugger von Glött, German politician (died 1981)
30 October – Gerhard Domagk German pathologist and bacteriologist (died 1964)
16 November – Paul Hindemith, German composer and conductor (died 1963)
23 November – Rudolf Katz, German politician and judge (died 1961)
2 December – Erwin Casmir, fencer (died 1982)
29 December – Oswald Freisler, lawyer (died 1939)

Deaths

13 March – Louise Otto-Peters, German women's rights movement activist (born 1819)
20 March – Woldemar, Prince of Lippe, nobleman (born 1824)
31 March – Georg von Dollmann, German architect (born 1830)
11 April – Julius Lothar Meyer, German chemist (born 1830)
23 April – Carl Ludwig, German physician and physiologist (born 1816)
30 April – Gustav Freytag, German playwright (born 1816)
23 May – Franz Ernst Neumann, German mineralogist, physicist and mathematician (born 1798)
2 June – Heinrich von Friedberg, German politician (born 1813)
30 June – Hermann Knoblauch, German physicist (born 1820)
14 July – Karl Heinrich Ulrichs, German writer (born 1825)
1 August – Heinrich von Sybel, German historian (born 1817)
5 August – Friedrich Engels, German philosopher, social scientist and journalist (born 1820)
28 August – Princess Elisabeth Anna of Prussia, Prussian princess (born 1857)
8 September – Adam Opel, German founder of the German automobile company Adam Opel AG (born 1837)
24 September – Heinrich Adolf von Bardeleben, German surgeon (born 1819)
8 November – Johannes Overbeck, German archaeologist (born 1826)
11 November – Gustav Langenscheidt, German publisher (born 1832)
14 December – Paul Melchers, German cardinal of Roman-Catholic Church (born 1813)

References

 
Years of the 19th century in Germany
Germany
Germany
Germany